David King (born 24 August 1981 in Australia) is a former American football and Australian rules football player. He was signed by the New England Patriots of the National Football League as a punter on 14 April 2010, but was waived by the team on 11 June 2010.

References

External links
New England Patriots bio

1981 births
Living people
American football punters
Australian expatriate sportspeople in the United States
Australian players of American football
Euroa Football Club players
Bundoora Football Club players
Australian rules footballers from Victoria (Australia)
Footballers who switched code
New England Patriots players